All Points East is an annual music festival held over two weekends in London's Victoria Park, run by AEG Presents. The 10-day event comprises one festival weekend, four days of free entry and community activities known as "In the Neighbourhood" and finally three standalone headline shows in their APE Presents series. The first year of All Points East was held in 2018 with LCD Soundsystem, The xx and Björk headlining the festival weekend and Catfish and the Bottlemen, The National and Nick Cave headlining the three standalone shows the following weekend.

On 6 November 2018, it was announced that The Chemical Brothers would headline the first day of All Points East 2019, with Hot Chip, Primal Scream, Spiritualized and more. This was followed by the announcement that Bon Iver would close the festival. The other four headliners for 2019 were The Strokes, Christine and the Queens, Bring Me the Horizon and Mumford and Sons.

In December 2018, All Points East won the award for Line-Up of the Year at the UK Festival Awards. In May 2019, All Points East won the award for Best Festival at the Music Week Awards 2019.

Capacity at the 2019 festival was stated as 40,000.

All Points East Festival 2018

All Points East Festival 2019

All Points East Festival 2020 (cancelled) 
The 2020 festival was cancelled due to the COVID-19 pandemic. Before the cancellation the announced lineup was:

All Points East Festival 2021 
After a one-year absence, All Points East Festival returned in 2021. It was held on 27 August to 2 September 2021. The headliners were London Grammar, Jorja Smith, Jamie xx, Kano, Bicep, Foals, and Bombay Bicycle Club.

References 

Music festivals in London